Sovereignty, was a nationalist political party in Italy. It is a part of the neo-fascist organization CasaPound.

The party supported an alliance with the right-wing parties Northern League and Us with Salvini.

Electoral results

Regional Councils

Leadership 

 Simone di Stefano (2015–present)

References

2015 establishments in Italy
Eurosceptic parties in Italy
Political parties established in 2015
Defunct political parties in Italy
Neo-fascist organisations in Italy
Political parties with year of disestablishment missing